Gabriel Boschilia (born 5 March 1996) is a Brazilian professional footballer who plays as an midfielder for Coritiba.

Club career

São Paulo
Born in Piracicaba and raised in Santa Bárbara d'Oeste, Boschilia began his youth career at neighbouring Guarani. In November 2012 he signed a three-year deal with São Paulo, from an undisclosed fee  (later revealed as R$600,000) and a €10 million clause. was initially assigned to the youth side.

On 22 January 2014 Boschilia made his first-team debut, coming on as a second-half substitute and also assisting Douglas in the last of a 4–0 home routing over Mogi Mirim. On 6 March he signed a new deal with Tricolor, running until March 2019.

Boschilia made his Série A debut on 20 April, starting in a 3–0 home success over Botafogo. His first goal in the category came on 23 November, the game's only in an away win against Santos.

Monaco
On 10 August 2015, Boschilia signed a five-year contract with Ligue 1 side AS Monaco FC, for a rumoured €9 million fee.
On 11 January 2016, Boschilia was loaned to Standard Liège for the remainder of the season.

FC Nantes 
Boschilia joined FC Nantes on a season-long loan deal on 7 August 2018.

Internacional 
On 28 January 2020, Brazilian club Internacional announced the signing of Boschilia, on a three-year contract.

International career
On 9 July 2013, Boschilia was called up for Brazil under-17s ahead of the World Cup. He finished the tournament as Brazil's top goalscorer, netting six times (only one goal behind overall top scorer Valmir Berisha) but his side was defeated in the quarterfinals.

Career statistics

Honours

Club
Monaco
Ligue 1: 2016–17

References

External links
São Paulo official profile 

1996 births
Living people
People from Piracicaba
Brazilian people of Italian descent
Brazilian footballers
Brazil under-20 international footballers
Association football midfielders
Campeonato Brasileiro Série A players
Ligue 1 players
Belgian Pro League players
São Paulo FC players
AS Monaco FC players
Standard Liège players
FC Nantes players
Sport Club Internacional players
Coritiba Foot Ball Club players
Brazil youth international footballers
Brazilian expatriate footballers
Brazilian expatriate sportspeople in France
Expatriate footballers in France
Expatriate footballers in Monaco
Brazilian expatriate sportspeople in Belgium
Expatriate footballers in Belgium
Footballers from São Paulo (state)